The 2013 PFF National Men's U-23 Championship (known as the PFF-Suzuki U-23 Championship for sponsorship reasons) is the second edition of a football tournament in the Philippines organized by the Philippine Football Federation (PFF) and Japanese automaker Suzuki. It is the national competition of Men's Under-23 players representing the member associations of Philippine Football Federation.

Host
On March 19, it was reported that the Final Qualifying Round will be held at Perdices Stadium in Dumaguete.

After a month-long delay, the regional qualifying and semi-final rounds of the 2013 PFF Suzuki Under 23 Championship resumed on May 17 until May 28 in Dumaguete. The one-game finals showdown played on May 30 at 2:30 pm in the same venue.

Schedule
 May 17 to 26, 2013 - Final Qualifying Round - Dumaguete 
 May 28, 2013 - Semi-finals - Dumaguete
 May 30, 2013 - Finals - Dumaguete

Groups

Group A
Matches to be played at Perdices Memorial Coliseum in Dumaguete, on 17–26 May 2013 (all times UTC+8).

Group B
Matches to be played at Perdices Memorial Coliseum in Dumaguete, on 17–26 May 2013 (all times UTC+8).

Knockout stage

Semi-finals

Third-place Playoff

Finals

Awards
The following were the competition’s top individual awardees.
Golden Boot Awards: Joshua Beloya (NOFA), Rudane Tamon (North Cotabato) and Juven Benitez (North Cotabato)
Most Valuable Player: Joshua Beloya (NOFA)
Best Defender: Anthony Tongson (NOFA)
Best Goalkeeper: Dominador Tato (Davao)
Best Midfielder: Joshua Beloya (NOFA)
Fair Play Award: Davao

References

PFF National Men's Under-23 Championship seasons
2013 in Philippine football
Sports in Negros Oriental